Ars-en-Ré is a commune on the Île de Ré in the western French department of Charente-Maritime, in Nouvelle-Aquitaine.

Formerly called just Ars, the commune changed to its current name on 8 March 1962.

The inhabitants of the commune are known as Arsais or Arsaises but they are nicknamed the Casserons: the casseron is a baby cuttlefish, a saltwater fish commonly found on the island.

Geography

Ars-en-Ré is one of 10 communes located on the Île de Ré off the coast of La Rochelle and is in the north-western part of the island some 8 km west of Saint-Martin-de-Ré. Access to the commune is by the D735 road which crosses to the island from the end of National Highway N237 at La Rochelle. The D735 passes along the north coast of the island through Saint-Martin-de-Ré and continues north-west to the commune passing through the town and continuing north-west to the Baleines Lighthouse. Apart from the town there is the village of La Grange nearby on the coast and Le Martray to the east along the coast. The town occupies the centre of the commune and there are forests on the western side with the rest of the commune farmland including extensive salt farms.

Its harbour is the largest on the Île de Ré and is located at the bottom of the Fier d'Ars (a body of water penetrating the land from the north-east and bordered by marshes), which is reached by a channel through the salt farms. A lock closes the tidal basin which has 250 berths. A new basin with 130 berths is to be created in future at the channel entrance. There are 150 moorings on buoys in the outer harbour and the channel has a capacity of 550 berths, mainly dedicated to pleasure craft. A beach on the south coast of the island, bordered by a dyke to protect the land, extends to the Baleines Lighthouse at the western tip of the island.

Neighbouring communes and villages

History
The Prince of Soubise was defeated here in 1624.

The port was important during the "salt era" until the beginning of the 20th century. The gabelle or salt tax was significant in the area.

Heraldry

Administration

List of Successive Mayors

Demography
In 2017 the commune had 1,307 inhabitants.

Distribution of Age Groups
The population of the town is relatively old. The ratio of persons above the age of 60 years (40.2%) is higher than the national average (21.6%) and the departmental average (28.1%). As with national and departmental allocations, the male population of the town is less than the female population (45.9% against 48.4% nationally and 48.2% at the departmental level).

Percentage Distribution of Age Groups in Ars-en-Ré and Charente-Maritime Department in 2017

Source: INSEE

Sites and Monuments
The village is a member of Les Plus Beaux Villages de France (the most beautiful villages in France).

Since 2011 the commune has belonged to the network "Villages of stone and water", a label initiated by the General Council to promote exceptional sites with the distinction of being located near a body of water (sea, river, pond ...).

Civil Heritage
Ars-en-Ré has a number of buildings that have been registered as historical monuments by the Ministry of Culture. These are:

Windmills (17th-18th century)
Houses (16th-20th century)
Guardhouse at Place Carnot (18th century) 
War Memorial at Place Carnot (1925) 
Jules Perrier Museum at Place de la Chapelle (19th century) 
Salt Refinery at Rue de Mouillebarbe (19th century) 
Two Salt Works on Rue Mouillebarbe (19th century) 
Tower at Batterie-Karola (1942-1944) 
Kora-Karola Artillery Battery which was part of the German Atlantic Wall (military area). 
Fort of Le Martray (1674)

There are over 200 items in Ars-en-Ré that are registered as historical objects, several of which are in private collections.

Other sites of interest
The Port with its new tidal basin at the entrance of the access channel.
Le Martray, the narrowest point of the island.
The Fiers d'Ars
Salt farms
The old station of the Petit train de l'Île de Ré (1898) at the port.
The surfing spot at Grignon Point.

Religious Heritage
Many religious buildings and monuments are registered as historical monuments at the Ministry of Culture:
The Priory of Saint-Étienne in the Place Carnot (11th-17th centuries) The Priory contains a very large number of items that are registered as historical objects.
The Convent of the Sisters of Wisdom at Rue du Havre (1862) 
A Monumental Cross at the Port (1899) 
A Monumental Cross on the Route de Saint-Clément (1836) 
The Pinaud Cross on the Route de Saint-Clément (destroyed)(17th century) 
A Monumental Cross on N735 (1890)
The Church of Saint-Étienne (12th century). Its bell tower, painted in black and white, serves as a Daymark for sailors.
The Convent of the Sisters of Charity (18th century) 
The Protestant Church (destroyed) (1603)

Ars-en-Ré Picture Gallery
Ars-en-Ré

The Church

Birds

Fishing and Boats

Notable people linked to the commune
Mathurin Renaud (14 October 1641 – 1676), born in Ars-en-Ré (parish of Saint-Étienne), an important historical figure: a pioneer of New France and one of the first inhabitants of Charlesbourg.
William Barbotin (1861-1931), painter and engraver.
Marie-Thérèse Dethan-Roullet (1870-1945), painter, was born here.
Lionel Jospin, former Prime Minister of France, had a house here where he stayed regularly.
Claude Barma, former Italian Film director, father of Catherine Barma, was buried here.
In the Narthex of the church there is a representation of John Vianney (1786-1859), the famous "Curé of Ars" although he was a priest in the commune of Ars-sur-Formans in Ain.

See also
Communes of the Charente-Maritime department

References

External links
Ars-en-Ré official website 
Île de Ré on the official site of the department of Charente-Maritime 
Ars-en-Ré on Géoportail, National Geographic Institute (IGN) website 
Ars on the 1750 Cassini Map

Communes of Charente-Maritime
Plus Beaux Villages de France
Île de Ré
Populated coastal places in France